The 2019 Benue State House of Assembly election was held on March 9, 2019, to elect members of the Benue State House of Assembly in Nigeria. All the 30 seats were up for election in the Benue State House of Assembly.

Titus Uba from PDP representing Vandeikya-Kyan constituency was elected Speaker, while Christopher Adaji from PDP representing Ohimini constituency was elected Deputy Speaker.

Results 
The result of the election is listed below.

 Agnes Uloko from PDP won Ado constituency
 Edoh Godwin from PDP won Agatu constituency
 Abu James from PDP won Apa constituency
 Bunde Torkuma from PDP won Buruku constituency
 Agaibe N from PDP won Gboko East constituency
 Terna Achir from PDP won Gboko West constituency
 William Marange from PDP won Guma constituency
 Agbatse Geoffery from PDP won Gwer East constituency
 Chemetyo Damian from PDP won Gwer West constituency
 Agbidyeh Akute from APC won Katsina-Ala East constituency
 Orban Terungwa from APC won Katsina-Ala West constituency
 Dyako Tavershima from ADC won Konshisha constituency
 Tertsea Gbishe from PDP won Kwande East constituency
 Sugh Abanyi from PDP won Kwande West constituency
 Yagba Victor from PDP won Logo constituency
 Kwaghzer-Kudi Thomas from APC won Makurdi North constituency
 Terwase Aondoaka from PDP won Makurdi South constituency
 Onche Peter from PDP won Obi constituency
 Peter Enemari from PDP won Ogbadibo constituency
 Christopher Adaji from PDP won Ohimini constituency
 Ogbu Otumala from APC won Oju I constituency
 Okanga Okponya from PDP won Oju II constituency
 Anthony Agom from PDP won Okpokwu constituency
 Odeh Baba from APC won Otukpo/Akpa constituency
 Michael Audu from PDP won Adoka/Ugboju constituency
 Mngutyo Bem from APC won Tarka constituency
 Thomas Mlanga from PDP won Ukum constituency
 Abass Akoso from PDP won Ushongo constituency
 Ucha Dominic from PDP won Vandeikya-Tiev constituency
 Uba Titus from PDP won Vandeikya-Kyan constituency

References 

Benue
Benue State elections